Nikola Maraš (born 19 December 1995) is a Serbian professional footballer who plays as a defender for Spanish club Deportivo Alavés, on loan from Almería.

Club career

Rad
On 26 May 2013, Maraš made his senior debut for Rad, coming on as a second-half substitute for Uroš Vitas in a 3–1 home league win over Radnički Niš. He scored his first goal for the club on 16 August 2014, giving his side a 2–1 win over Borac Čačak also at the Stadion Kralj Petar I. Over the course of the 2014–15 Serbian SuperLiga, Maraš established himself as a regular member of the team's defensive line, recording the full 90 minutes in all of his 23 appearances. He was subsequently named as the team's captain, being an undisputed starter in the following two seasons (2015–16 and 2016–17). On 5 August 2017, Maraš made his 100th league appearance for Rad in a 1–2 loss to Mladost Lučani.

Chaves
On 31 August 2017, Maraš was officially transferred to Portuguese club Chaves on a four-year deal.

Almería
On 15 August 2019, Maraš joined Spanish club Almería on a one-year loan. On 22 August of the following year, after being a regular starter, he signed a permanent four-year deal with the club.

On 31 August 2021, Maraš moved to La Liga side Rayo Vallecano on loan for the 2021–22 season. On 11 August of the following year, he moved to second division side Deportivo Alavés also in a temporary one-year deal.

International career
On 29 September 2016, Maraš played the full 90 minutes in Serbia's 0–3 friendly loss to Qatar. He also appeared in a 0–0 draw against the United States on 29 January 2017, playing the entire match.

Statistics

References

External links
 
 
 
 

1995 births
Living people
Footballers from Belgrade
Serbian footballers
Association football defenders
Serbian SuperLiga players
FK Rad players
Primeira Liga players
G.D. Chaves players
La Liga players
Segunda División players
UD Almería players
Rayo Vallecano players
Deportivo Alavés players
Serbia international footballers
Serbia under-21 international footballers
Serbia youth international footballers
Serbian expatriate footballers
Serbian expatriate sportspeople in Portugal
Serbian expatriate sportspeople in Spain
Expatriate footballers in Portugal
Expatriate footballers in Spain